Yitzhak Wittenberg (1907 – 16 July 1943) was a Jewish resistance fighter in Vilnius during World War II. He was a member of the Communist Party. He was the commander of the Fareynikte Partizaner Organizatsye (FPO), a resistance group in the Vilna Ghetto which was preparing an uprising should the final moments of the ghetto come. When the Germans learned about the existence of a Communist, Wittenberg, in the ghetto, they made a request to the head of the Jewish council, Jacob Gens, that Wittenberg should be surrendered to them. Gens betrayed Wittenberg to the police who arrested him, but he was freed by young FPO fighters. Subsequently, Gens insisted that Wittenberg surrender. Feeling he did not have the support of the ghetto for an uprising and fearing a massacre, he surrendered.

Some accounts say that he was later found dead in his prison cell having swallowed poison; others say that his mutilated body was found the next day. It has been speculated that Gens slipped the poison to Wittenberg. The Wittenberg affair was discussed in the Eichmann trial. The story of his death is told in the song Yitzhak Wittenberg.

References

External links
The Wittenberg Affair
Resistance in the Vilna Ghetto
Song about Wittenberg
How Did Itzik Wittenberg, Hero of the Vilna Ghetto, Die?, Menachem Kaiser, April 24, 2017

1907 births
1943 suicides
Jewish resistance members during the Holocaust
People who died in the Vilna Ghetto
People who committed suicide in prison custody
Suicides by poison
Soviet civilians killed in World War II
Jewish Lithuanian history
Suicides by Jews during the Holocaust
Lithuanian communists
Lithuanian Jews who died in the Holocaust
Suicides in Lithuania